Jeux sans frontières (Games Without Frontiers or Games Without Borders) was a Europe-wide television game show. The 1992 edition of was won by the team from Třebíč in the then Czechoslovakia.

1992 was the first and only year in which Tunisia performed in the Jeux sans frontières. They were the only African nation in the show and they were not very successful, as they were most of the time finished in the lower half of the table, only archiving a second place in Heat 9, thanks to Nabeul, who qualified to the Final with it, but finished last there.

Participating countries and cities

Heats

Casale Monferrato, Italy (Heat 1)

Lisbon, Portugal (Heat 2)

Alfortville, Paris, France (Heat 3)

Třebíč, Czechoslovakia (Heat 4)

Swansea, United Kingdom (Heat 5)

Casale Monferrato, Italy (Heat 6)

Lisbon, Portugal (Heat 7)

Alfortville, Paris, France (Heat 8)

Rožnov pod Radhoštěm, Czechoslovakia (Heat 9)

Swansea, United Kingdom (Heat 10)

Final
The final round was held in Ponta Delgada, Azores, Portugal.

Qualifying teams
The teams which qualified from each country to the final were:

Results

References

Jeux sans frontières
1992 television seasons
Television game shows with incorrect disambiguation